The 2014 European Baseball Championship was an international baseball tournament held in the Czech Republic and Germany.

The defending champion Italy lost in the final to the Netherlands, who became champion for the 21st time.

Qualification

The top ten teams of the 2012 European Championship were qualified automatically for the tournament.

12 teams played a B-Level Qualifier from July 22 to 27, 2013. Great Britain (11th in 2012) and Russia (12th in 2012) qualified for the tournament.

Round 1

Pool A

Standings

Source: www.baseballstats.eu

Schedule

Source: www.baseballstats.eu

Pool B

Standings

Source: www.baseballstats.eu

Schedule

Source: www.baseballstats.eu

Round 2

Pool C

Standings

Source: www.baseballstats.eu

Schedule

Source: www.baseballstats.eu

Classification game

7th/8th place game

Source: www.baseballstats.eu

Pool D

Standings

Source: www.baseballstats.eu

Schedule

Source: www.baseballstats.eu

Final

Source: www.baseballstats.eu

Final standings

References

External links
European cup 2014 Germany official site 
European cup 2014 Czech official site 

European Baseball Championship
2014
International baseball competitions hosted by Germany
2014
2014 in German sport
2014 in Czech sport